The Brazil national football team participated in the 1982 FIFA World Cup, and in doing so maintained their record of being the only team to enter every World Cup Finals.

Brazil played until the Second Group Round, where they were defeated by Italy. This result meant that they finished the tournament in fifth place for the second time in history (1954 was the previous instance).

Qualifying
1982 FIFA World Cup qualification (CONMEBOL Group 1)

February 8, 1981, Caracas, Venezuela -  0 - 1 

February 22, 1981, La Paz, Bolivia -  1 - 2 

March 22, 1981, Rio de Janeiro, Brazil -  3 - 1 

March 29, 1981, Goiânia, Brazil -  5 - 0 

Brazil qualified.

The Cup

First Group Round
All eyes were on Brazil in Group 6. In Zico, Sócrates, Falcão, Éder and others, the rejuvenated auriverde boasted an offensive firepower that promised a return to the glory days of 1970. The tri-campeão lived up to all expectations in the First Group round, beating an unexpectedly strong Soviet side 2–1 in a very entertaining first match thanks to a 20-metre Éder goal two minutes from time, then Scotland and New Zealand, scoring four goals each time.

Group 6

Second Group Round
It was in Group C, a true "Group of Death" with Brazil, Argentina and Italy, that World Cup history was made. In the opener, the Azzurri prevailed 2–1 over Diego Maradona's side in an ill-tempered game in which Italy defenders Gaetano Scirea and Claudio Gentile proved to be able to stop the Argentinian attack.

Argentina now needed a win over Brazil on the second day, but they were no match. Although the Brazilians had the better of the play, Maradona's Argentina side continued pushing for an equaliser and had a clear penalty denied by the referee . After that, Brazil scored twice, and Maradona was sent off after he kicked a rival in a moment of unsportsmanship.

The third-day match between Brazil and Italy would be a game to remember. Twice Italy went in the lead through Paolo Rossi's goals, and twice Brazil came back. At 2-2, Brazil would have gone through on goal difference, but on 74 minutes, a poor clearance from an Italy corner kick went back to the Brazil six-yard line where Rossi and Francesco Graziani were waiting. Both world-class strikers reflexively aimed at the same shot, Rossi connecting and sending Italy to the semifinals in one of the all-time great games of World Cup history.	

Group C

Starting 11

|}

Goalscorers

4 goals
 Zico

3 goals
 Falcão

2 goals
 Éder
 Serginho
 Sócrates

1 goal
 Júnior
 Oscar

References

External links
1982 FIFA World Cup on FIFA.com
Details at RSSSF
History of the World Cup-1982
Planet World Cup - Spain 1982

 
Countries at the 1982 FIFA World Cup